Rory Nicholas Gaffney (born 23 October 1989) is an Irish professional footballer who plays as a striker for League of Ireland Club Shamrock Rovers

Career

Limerick
Gaffney started his career at League of Ireland First Division team Mervue United before joining Premier League team Limerick in July 2011. He completed his studies at the Galway-Mayo Institute of Technology while playing in Ireland.

Cambridge United
On 25 November 2014 Gaffney agreed a move to League Two club Cambridge United when the transfer window opened. His first season was beset with injury and he made his Football League debut on 26 September 2015, replacing Conor Newton in the 81st minute in a 1–0 win against Stevenage at the Abbey Stadium providing the cross from which Cambridge scored. Gaffney went on to score twice on his first start for Cambridge United in the 3–2 away win over Yeovil Town on 23 October.

Bristol Rovers
On 14 January 2016, Gaffney moved permanently to League Two club Bristol Rovers after a successful loan spell. After scoring 5 goals in 7 games for the West Country Club. Gaffney ended the season with a tally of 8 league goals as he played a useful part in the club's promotion to Football League One.

Gaffney scored his first goal in Sky Bet League One and his first for the club since 16 April 2016 on 1 October 2016 with his club's first goal in a dramatic 3–2 win over Northampton Town. Rory scored his first goal since 10 December 2016 in the 4–2 victory over Bury on 11 March 2017 in a 2–0 victory over Southend United. He scored his second goal in a week scoring what would prove to be the winner in a 2–1 victory over Chesterfield taking his season total to 4 league goals. Gaffney ended the season with a total of 9 goals including two in a 4–2 loss vs Peterborough United as his side narrowly missed the playoffs.

Gaffney scored his first goal of the 2017–18 season to make it 3–1 in a 4–1 defeat to Peterborough United on 12 August 2017 when he headed home a Lee Brown cross at the back post.

Salford City
In June 2018 he joined Salford City on a three-year contract. He made his debut in the opening match of the 2018–19 season on 4 August as Salford drew 1–1 at home to Leyton Orient. His first season with the club ended in success as Salford City won promotion to the Football League for the first time in their history in their first season in the fifth tier. Gaffney scored a penalty in a play-off semi-final shootout victory against Eastleigh and came off of the bench in the 3–0 final victory over AFC Fylde.

Walsall (loan)
On 31 August 2019 he joined Walsall on loan for the remainder of the 2019–20 season, linking up with former-Rovers manager Darrell Clarke. After 25 appearances, scoring just once, Gaffney had his loan terminated in February 2020.

Shamrock Rovers 
On 24 February 2020, Salford City announced they and Gaffney had mutually parted ways and he had left the club and later that day signed for Shamrock Rovers. In April 2021, Gaffney opened his scoring for the club with a late equaliser against Sligo Rovers.

Gaffney scored twice at KF Teuta Durrës in a 2021–22 UEFA Europa Conference League tie where Rovers won 2-0 

In the 2022–23 UEFA Champions League Gaffney scored against Hibernians F.C. At the end of the 2022 season, a season in which Shamrock Rovers won the league for a third consecutive season, Gaffney was named the PFAI Players' Player of the Year at the end of season awards.

Career statistics

Honours
Limerick
League of Ireland First Division: 2012

Bristol Rovers
Football League Two third-place promotion: 2015–16

Salford City
National League play-offs: 2019

Shamrock Rovers
League of Ireland Premier Division (3): 2020, 2021, 2022
President of Ireland's Cup: 2022

PFAI Players' Player of the Year - 2022 

SRFC Player of the Year:
 Shamrock Rovers - 2022

References

External links

1989 births
Living people
Association footballers from County Galway
Republic of Ireland association footballers
Association football forwards
Mervue United A.F.C. players
Limerick F.C. players
Cambridge United F.C. players
Bristol Rovers F.C. players
Salford City F.C. players
Walsall F.C. players
Shamrock Rovers F.C. players
League of Ireland players
English Football League players
National League (English football) players
Irish expatriate sportspeople in England
Expatriate footballers in England